Straight to the Heart is an American game show that aired in 1989 from March 20-September 8. The program was hosted by Michael Burger and co-hosted by Barbara Lee Alexander.

Game format
Each episode features three men and three women looking for love, trying to find out which one of the three members of the opposite sex they are most compatible with.

Prior to the show, each team of men and women were asked three intimate questions about themselves. While on the air, three statements made by the team (one for each member) were revealed to the opposite sex. Each one decided which one pertains to him/her. Then the first team revealed who gave what statement. Each contestant got $50 for each opposite sex who said his/her statement. What makes this game different from other shows using money as score, money was not used as score. It was all about how compatible they are to each other. The man and the woman who matched each other's answers the most wins the game and became a couple.

Bonus round
The now formed couple played a bonus round for more money or a trip. They each held letters "A" and "B"; they are what they would use to answer a series of either/or questions (all marked A or B). Also the couple wore special heart-shaped blindfold glasses to prevent them from seeing each other's answers. Host Burger asked questions about vacationing in a trip they were going for, for the duration of 45 seconds. After each question was read, the couple each held up one of the two letters indicating the one s/he liked best. The studio audience will keep them informed of how many matches they have made. Each match was worth $50. If the couple matched five times before the 45 seconds ran out, the couple won a choice of either $500 in cash each or the trip.

References

External links
 https://www.youtube.com/watch?v=RMZRgRZ8rws

1989 American television series debuts
1989 American television series endings
1980s American game shows
First-run syndicated television programs in the United States
American dating and relationship reality television series
Television series by MGM Television